Hamilton Hall is an academic building on the Morningside Heights campus of Columbia University on College Walk (116th Street) at 1130 Amsterdam Avenue in Manhattan, New York City, serving as the home of Columbia College. It was built in 1905–1907 and was designed by McKim, Mead & White in the Neoclassical style; the building was part of the firm's original master plan for the campus. The building was the gift of the John Stewart Kennedy, a former trustee of Columbia College, and is named after Alexander Hamilton, who attended King's College, Columbia's original name. A statue of Hamilton by William Ordway Partridge stands outside the building entrance. Hamilton Hall is the location of the Columbia College administrative offices.

History

The original Hamilton Hall was built in 1878 in the Gothic Revival style and located on Madison Avenue between 49th and 50th streets on the college's former Midtown campus. It was 5 stories tall and had an elaborate turret at its northwest corner. It was located directly across 50th Street from the Villard Houses which still stand today.

When Columbia reconstituted itself as a university and relocated to Morningside Heights in the 1890s, there were originally no plans for the area south of 116th Street, where Hamilton Hall now sits, or for any facilities dedicated to the undergraduate college. Nevertheless, college advocates persevered and the cornerstone for the new Hamilton Hall was laid in 1905. The building was designed by the firm of McKim, Mead, and White in the neoclassical style, in conformity with the rest of the university campus. It was completed in 1907.

In the latter half of the 20th century, Hamilton Hall was taken over several times in the course of student protest activity, most famously during the protests of April 1968. In the course of this protest, a multiracial group first barricaded themselves inside the building, imprisoning acting dean Henry S. Coleman in his office. The black students eventually asked the white students to leave, prompting the latter's takeover of several other university buildings. After the violent end to the April activities, Hamilton was the most peacefully cleared hall but was briefly reoccupied later that year. The building was also the site of a major 1985 student strike and barricade to demand university divestment from South Africa, which was under the apartheid system at the time, as well as ethnic studies classes at the university.

Most recently, Hamilton Hall has undergone extensive renovations in order to restore many of its historic details. Two stained glass windows depicting Sophocles and Virgil, gifts from the class of 1885 and 1891, respectively, were installed in the Hamilton Hall lobby in 2003. The building houses many of the classes of Columbia College's famous Core Curriculum, and it is apparently a tradition of the teachers of the Core class Contemporary Civilization to watch students filing into the building for exams from the roof of nearby Butler Library.

References

External links

100 Years of Hamilton Hall

Columbia University campus
McKim, Mead & White buildings
University and college academic buildings in the United States
School buildings completed in 1907
Neoclassical architecture in New York City